The Hochelaga Archipelago, also known as the Montreal Islands, is a group of islands at the confluence of the Saint Lawrence and Ottawa rivers in the southwestern part of the province of Quebec, Canada.

Population

On 1 July 2021, the Hochelaga Archipelago officially had 2,556,040 inhabitants in the following municipalities:

Size
Estimates of the number of islands in the archipelago vary. The most widely accepted number seems to be 234, although the number has been put as high as 325.

Islands
The largest island in the group is the Island of Montreal, which contains most of the city of Montreal and the central section of its metropolitan area. The city has jurisdiction over 74 smaller islands in the archipelago, most notably Nuns' Island (also known as Île des Sœurs in French), Île Bizard, and the two islands that served as the site of Expo 67, namely Saint Helen's Island (in French Île Sainte-Hélène) and the artificial Île Notre-Dame.

The second-largest island in the archipelago is Île Jésus, which along with the Îles Laval and several smaller islands makes up the city of Laval.

Other islands include the Îles de Boucherville, featuring a Québec National Park, Île Perrot, Salaberry-de-Valleyfield and the neighbouring Grande-Île, as well as the smaller Dorval Island and Dowker Island.

List of named islands

 Île à l'Aigle
 Île Avelle
 Île Barwick
 Île Béique
 Île Bellevue
 Île Bizard
 Île au Bois Blanc
 Île Bonfoin
 Îles de Boucherville, including:
 Île Charron
 Île de la Commune
 Île Dufault
 Île Grosbois
 Île Lafontaine
 Île Montbrun
 Île à Pinard
 Île Saint-Jean
 Île Sainte-Marguerite
 Île Tourte Blanche
 Île Bourdon
 Île Boutin
 Île Cadieux
 Île aux Canards
 Île aux Chats
 Île aux Cerfeuils
 Île aux Chèvres
 Île aux Plaines
 Île Claude
 Île Daoust
 Île Deslauriers
 Île Dixie
 Île Dorval
 Île Dowker
 Île au Foin
 Île Gagné
 Île Hiam
 Île Hog
 Île Jasmin
 Île Jésus
 Île Lamontagne
 Île Lapierre
 Îles Laval, including:
 Île Bigras 
 Île Pariseau
 Île Ronde
 Île Verte
 Île Madore
 Île Ménard
 Île Mercier
 Île Migneron
 Île Mitan
 Île de Montréal
 Île du Moulin de Saint-François
 Île aux Moutons
 Île Notre-Dame
 Îles de la Paix, including:
 Île au Diable
 Île du Docteur
 Île à Tambault
 Île à Thomas
 Île aux Veaux
 Île Paton
 Île aux Plaines
 Île Perrot
 Île Perry
 Île de Pierre
 Île aux Pins
 Île aux Pruches
 Îles des Rapides de Lachine or Îles du Sault-Saint-Louis, including:
 Île aux Hérons
 Île aux Chèvres
 Île au Diable
 les Sept-Soeurs
 Île aux Sternes
 Île Roussin
 Île de Roxboro
 Île Saint-Joseph
 Île Saint-Laurent
 Île Sainte-Hélène
 Île Saint-Pierre
 Île Sainte-Thérèse
 Île Serre
 Île des Sœurs (aka as Nuns' Island in English)
 Île Sunset
 Île Todd
 Île aux Tourtes
 Île du Tremblay
 Île à la Truie
 Île aux Vaches
 Îles de Varennes
 Île Vert
 Île de la Visitation
 Île Wight

Name
The archipelago takes its name from Hochelaga, an Iroquoian settlement on the Island of Montreal that was later settled by the French and grew to become the modern city of Montreal.

See also
 Montreal Archipelago Ecological Park
 Thousand Islands

References

 
River islands of Quebec
Landforms of Montreal
Islands of the Saint Lawrence River
Landforms of Laval, Quebec
Landforms of Montérégie
Archipelagoes of Canada